Deaf may refer to:
Deafness, a term with varying meanings in cultural and medical contexts:
Deaf culture, the set of beliefs and traditions of communities that are influenced by deafness and which use sign languages as the main means of communication
Hearing loss, a partial or total inability to hear
Deaf (album), the debut album from You've Got Foetus on Your Breath